The Mississippi Writers Trail is a series of historical markers which celebrate the literary, social, historical, and cultural contributions of Mississippi's most acclaimed and influential writers. An advisory committee of state cultural agencies oversees the process of installing historical markers in places of significance to an author's life. To emphasize the literary focus of the trail, the markers are cast in the shape of an open book and display information about the author's life with the goal of educating the public about the legacy of Mississippi writers.

Overview 

The Mississippi Writers Trail debuted on the State Capitol grounds in Jackson, Mississippi at the 2018 Mississippi Book Festival with an unveiling of two marker prototypes honoring Eudora Welty and Jesmyn Ward, connecting the past and present contributions of Mississippi authors. The program runs as an unfunded mandate which means these literary markers are produced and installed as funding becomes available. 

Initial support from a Statehood Grant through the National Endowment for the Humanities was key for installing the first phase of markers for the Trail. The Writers Trail has received additional support from the Mississippi Delta National Heritage Area, the Mississippi Gulf Coast National Heritage Area, and the City of Clarksdale, Mississippi to install markers for authors located within the service area of each organization.

Selection and placement process 
The Mississippi Writers Trail Advisory Committee, composed of many state cultural institutions, selects several scholars who identify potential authors for inclusion in the Writers Trail and to draft the text for each marker. Final locations are determined in consultation with local communities; authors or their surviving families are consulted for the market text as well.

Mississippi Writers Trail Advisory Committee 

 Mississippi Arts Commission
 Mississippi Development Authority, Visit Mississippi
 Mississippi Humanities Council
 Mississippi Library Commission
 Mississippi Department of History and Archives
 Community Foundation for Mississippi
 Mississippi Book Festival

Mississippi Writers Trail markers

References 

Writers from Mississippi
Mississippi culture
Historic sites in Mississippi
Historic trails and roads in the United States
Tourist attractions in Mississippi